Conewago may refer to:

Communities
Conewago Township, Pennsylvania (disambiguation)

Streams
Conewago Creek (west), in Adams and York Counties, Pennsylvania
Conewago Creek (east), Pennsylvania
Conewago Falls, an historic falls flanking Three Mile Island near Harrisburg, Pennsylvania

See also